Penguin Point Restaurant Group LLC, commonly referred to as Penguin Point, is an American regional fast-food restaurant chain that is mainly located in Northern Indiana. It currently has 9 locations throughout the region. Founded by Wallace Stouder and Mary Stouder, the first restaurant was opened in Wabash, Indiana. After the restaurant chain was purchased by US Assets in Texas, the restaurant chain began to expand to other areas.

History

Northern Indiana 
On June 6, 1950, Wallace Stouder and Mary Stouder founded Penguin Point and opened their first store at Wabash, Indiana. The restaurant was originally a carhop drive-in, and only operated during the summer. In 1961, the original owners gave ownership of the company to their brothers, Lloyd Stouder and Heleta Stouder. Wallace Stouder became CEO of Penguin Point after the transfer of ownership.

In spring of 2018, the restaurant chain was purchased by US Assets, Inc., a company located in Dallas, Texas. Meier was promoted to CEO after the acquisition. The new owner wanted to try out new changes to the restaurant. This first change was the start of selling breakfast foods to people. This idea was started in the Penguin Point restaurant in Warsaw, Indiana. In the fall of 2020, new restaurants were opened in North Manchester and Columbia City, Indiana.

In November, 2022 US Assets suddenly closed 7 locations leaving 9 still in operation. Wabash, Auburn, Elkhart at 1147 Center Street, Syracuse, Columbia City, North Manchester, South Bend and 2 in Warsaw remain open.

Beyond Northern Indiana 
Before US Assets acquired Penguin Point, a few Penguin Point restaurants were opened in Florida, Michigan, Ohio, and Texas. However, the restaurants eventually closed.

In May 2019, a Penguin Point restaurant was planned to be opened on Fayetteville, Arkansas. The restaurant officially opened on May 8, 2019. In August 2019, Penguin Point announced that another restaurant is planned to be opened at Owensboro, Kentucky and Louisville, Kentucky, along with another location in Jacksonville, North Carolina.

All restaurants outside of Northern Indiana are currently closed.

Products 
Penguin Point primarily serves burgers and chicken. They also serve fish, pork, french fries, and salads. The company names their burgers "Wally", which is named after the former owner Wallace Stouder, and it features the chain's signature "Wally" sauce. The chain is most famous for serving the pork tenderloin burger. As of April 2019, it only offered breakfast in the restaurant located in Warsaw. The menu includes breakfast sandwiches, burritos, and chicken on waffle. Along with this, the chain introduced fish to the menu.

Before the acquisition, their menu has changed little since 1950. This is due to poor reception of new food offerings when the restaurant tries to introduce them. For example, Penguin Point used to have sandwich wraps as part of their menu. However, due to poor sales, they were permanently removed from the menu.

References

Further reading

External links 
 

Restaurant chains in the United States
Regional restaurant chains in the United States
Fast-food chains of the United States
Restaurants established in 1950
Restaurants in Indiana